Marina de Souza Dantas Elali (born 6 April 1982, Natal, Brazil) is a Brazilian singer. She first became known after appearing in a talent competition show, Globo Television show FAMA,  in 2004. She released her debut self-titled album in 2005.

Discography

Albums

Collected

DVDs

Singles

Promotional Singles

References

 
1982 births
Living people
 English-language singers from Brazil
People from Natal, Rio Grande do Norte
21st-century Brazilian singers
21st-century Brazilian women singers